Cimerwa Cement Limited (CCL) is a manufacturer of cement in Rwanda with capacity of approximately 600,000 tones per year.

Location
The main factory of the company is located in Muganza Sector, in the town of Bugarama, in Rusizi District, in the Western Province of Rwanda. The coordinates of the main factory of Cimerwa are: 02°36'25.0"S, 29°01'03.0"E (Latitude:-2.606944; Longitude:29.017500). The company also maintains offices in the city of Kigali, the capital and largest city of Rwanda.

Overview
The installed factory capacity is 600,000 metric tonnes annually. Prior to 2018, the factory was performing at under 60 percent capacity (approximately 350,000 metric tonnes annually). In 2018, the factory was upgraded and increased its performance to approximately 74 percent of installed capacity (approximately 441,223 metric tonnes annually). The upgrade cost US$3.3 million, and lasted 26 days.

Prior to the 2018 upgrade, Cimerwa could produce 27,000 metric tonnes monthly, or approximately 54 percent of the 50,000 metric tonnes needed monthly to satisfy Rwanda's cement needs. With production of an expected 441,223 metric tonnes after the upgrade, it is expected cement importation into Rwanda will reduce.

The factory uses imported coal from Malawi and Tanzania, to fuel its kilns.

History
The company was established in 1982, with capacity of 50,000 metric tonnes annually. It was managed by a Chinese company, CBMC, under a "build-own-operate-transfer" model. During the 1994 Rwandan genocide, plant operations were suspended and 53 employees died. In 2001, plant capacity was increased to 100,000 metric tonnes annually.

In 2006, Cimerwa was privatized under the Rwanda Investment Group. Ownership transferred to several Rwanda-based institutions. PPC Limited acquired a 51 percent ownership in Cimerwa, for US$69.4 million in 2013. In 2015, the company assumed a new corporate identity to reflect the new ownership.

Products
As of May 2020, CIMERWA produces four types of portland cement; namely 1. SUREBUILD, a 42.5N premium cement meant for heavy construction projects 2. SURECEM, a 32.5N all-purpose cement ideal for concrete, mortar, plaster and brick joinery 3. SUREROAD, another 32.5N product, is a custom-made cement meant for road construction and 4. SUREWALL, is a 22.5X masonry cement specifically designed for plastering and brick joinery.

Ownership
Cimerwa Cement Limited operates as a 51 percent subsidiary of  Pretoria Portland Cement Company (PPC Limited), a South African cement-manufacturing conglomerate, whose shares of stock are traded on the Johannesburg Stock Exchange. The table below illustrates the shareholding in the company, as of June 2019. As of June 2019, the entire 49 percent shareholding owed by Rwandan shareholders was up for sale.

Pretoria Portland Cement Company controls eleven cement factories and a lime manufacturing facility in six African countries including South Africa, Botswana, Ethiopia and Rwanda.

See also
 List of cement manufacturers in Rwanda

References

External links
 Website of Cimerwa Cement Limited
 Rwanda cement maker Cimerwa doubles net profit to $3.9m As of 20 December 2021.

Companies established in 1982
1982 establishments in Rwanda
Rusizi District
Western Province, Rwanda
Cement companies of Rwanda